Julian "Joe" Bennett (born 20 April 1957) is a writer and columnist living in Lyttelton, New Zealand.

Born in England, Bennett emigrated to New Zealand when he was 29. Before his writing career, he worked as an English teacher at Christ's College in Christchurch. During this time, Bennett wrote the words to the musical "Tramps", which was presented as a co-production between Christ's College and St Margaret's College in 1994, and garnered a review in The Press.

Bennett is a columnist for Christchurch's newspaper The Press and for New Zealand Gardener as well as being an author.

From the "Introduction" to Fun Run and Other Oxymorons he describes himself as follows:
"If anything holds these articles together it is that I like people but not in herds. I distrust all beliefs, most thought and anything ending in  ism. Most opinion is emotion in fancy dress."

Bennett is a seasoned hitchhiker and has a dog called Blue. He has previously had two dogs called Baz and Jess. He is fond of dogs and this is reflected in the titles and cover art of many of his books.

He has been in segments on the New Zealand comedy show Moon TV hosted by "That Guy" Leigh Hart in a segment called "Bookzone: A Show About Books".

In December 2011 he appeared in the media for refusing to evacuate his Lyttelton home as ordered by the Christchurch City Council due to fears of falling rocks if another earthquake was to occur.

Selected bibliography

Just Walking the Dogs (1998) 
Sleeping Dogs and Other Lies (1999) 
Fun Run and Other Oxymorons (2000)  (A collection of his first two books).
So Help Me Dog (2000) 
Sit (2001) 
Doggone (2002) 
Bedside Lovers (and Other Goats) (2002) 
Barking (2003) 
Unmuzzled (2004) 
A Land of Two Halves (2004)  
Dogmatic (2005) 
Down Boy (2006) 
Mustn't Grumble: An Accidental Return To England (2006) 
Love, Death, Washing-up, Etc: Joe Bennett Sorts It Out (2007) 
Eyes Right (and They's Wrong) (2007) 
Where Underpants Come From: Travels in the new China (2008)  
Laugh? I Could Have Cried (2008) 
Alive And Kicking (2008) 
The World's Your Lobster (2009) 
Hello Dubai (2010) 
Celebrity Cat Recipes (2010) 
Double Happiness: How bullshit works (2012) 
Fish like a Drink (2013) 
King Rich (2015)

References

External links
joebennett.nz
 Archive of Bennett's columns at The Press

New Zealand writers
Living people
1957 births
English emigrants to New Zealand
People from Lyttelton, New Zealand